Voyage of the Valkyrie is a video game for the TRS-80 and Apple II published in 1981 by Advanced Operating Systems. It was written by Leo Christopherson.

Gameplay
Voyage of the Valkyrie is a game in which the player pilots the ship Valkyrie attempting to defeat the ten castles on the island of Fugloy.

Reception
Forrest Johnson reviewed Voyage of the Valkyrie in The Space Gamer No. 48. Johnson commented that "Voyage of the Valkyrie is a novel arcade game, more valuable to TRS-80 users than those who game on the Apple."

References

External links
review in 80-U.S.
Review in SoftSide
Review in 80 Micro
Review in Creative Computing
Entry in Things To Do With Your Apple Computer

1981 video games
Apple II games
Combat flight simulators
TRS-80 games
Video games developed in the United States